Gaia or Gaea, in comics, may refer to:

 Gaia (Marvel Comics), a character in the Marvel Universe (an alien mutant and former member of Generation X)
 Gaea (Marvel Comics), a character in the Marvel Universe (Goddess of the Earth)
 Gaia Noble, a character in the comics series Noble Causes
 Gaia (DC Comics), a character in Green Lantern comics
 Gaea (DC Comics), a character in the DC Comics (Goddess of the Earth)
 My Gaia, a shōjo-ai manga comic by chuu
 Gaia Records, a publishing company in the manga Nana

See also
Gaia (disambiguation)